The Rye House Rockets were a speedway team based at Rye House Stadium, Hoddesdon, England. They competed in various British speedway leagues from 1954 to 2018.

History
Rye House began life in 1934 hosting open meetings. Whilst at Hackney in 1937, Dicky Case took over the sixty acre estate of Rye House and set up a training school at Rye House Stadium, operating under the name of the Hackney Motor Club. The school operated until 1938 when Rye House entered the Sunday Dirt-track League.

Their first season competing in a league was in 1954 when as the Rye House Roosters they finished third in the 1954 Southern Area League. The team then won two league titles; the 1955 Southern Area League and the 1956 Southern Area League.

The team competed in the 2nd division of speedway for 20 years, from 1974 to 1993, with their best successes being the 1980 league champions and 1979 Knockout Cup winners.

In September 2018, the Lakeside Hammers, a speedway team in the SGB Championship, moved to the Rye House Stadium. The Rye House Rockets had “been annulled by the Speedway Control Bureau” earlier that year.

In 1999, the team returned to league action in the Conference League (the 3rd division) but they soon moved up to division 2 and formed a junior side to compete in the Conference League. The team's last major honours were winning the league during the 2005 Premier League speedway season and repeating the feat two years later in 2007, after winning the playoffs.

Junior teams
Rye House ran a junior side called the Rye House Raiders and later the Rye House Cobras. The team competed in the Conference League and then the National League. The Raiders won the Conference League Four-Team Championship in 2003.

Riders

Rider of the year

 2017:  Scott Nicholls
 2016:  Stuart Robson
 2015:  Edward Kennett
 2014:  Edward Kennett
 2013:  Tyson Nelson
 2012:  Jason Garrity
 2011:  Chris Neath
 2010:  Linus Sundstrom
 2009:  Luke Bowen
 2008:  Luke Bowen
 2007:  Tai Woffinden
 2006:  Steve Boxall
 2005:  Stuart Robson
 2004:  Tommy Allen
 2003:  Scott Robson
 2002:  David Mason

Notable riders

Season summary

Junior riders

2009 team

2008 team

2007 team

2006 team

References

Speedway Premier League teams
Sport in Hertfordshire
Hoddesdon